The Castle of Guadamur is castle in Guadamur, Spain.

History and description 
It was built from scratch in the 15th century by Pedro López de Ayala, although works continued beyond the turn of the century. Erected on a hill to the East of the urban nucleus of Guadamur, it consists of a square main body, with circular towers and a larger ortogonal keep, standing 30 metre high.

It was restored from a previous state of ruin following its acquisition by the Baron of Cuatro Torres in 1887.

References 
Citations

Bibliography
 
 

Castles in Castilla–La Mancha
Buildings and structures in the Province of Toledo